Darrel Burton Brewster (September 1, 1930 – January 3, 2020), known as Pete Brewster, was an American football end, coach, and collegiate football and basketball player.

College career
Brewster played football and basketball at Portland High School, located in Portland, Indiana. After high school, he went to Purdue University, located in West Lafayette, Indiana, on a basketball scholarship, playing for Ray Eddy. He also played varsity football as a Boilermaker for head coach Stuart Holcomb.
.

Professional career
Brewster was selected in the 2nd round (21st overall) in the 1952 NFL Draft. In his first season with the Cleveland Browns, he filled in on both defense and offense. He became the team's first-string offensive left end during his second season and was the team's second-ranking pass receiver during the 1953 season.  He was selected for Pro Bowl honors in 1955 and 1956 at the tight end position. After seven seasons with the Browns, he played for the Pittsburgh Steelers for two seasons.

Coaching career
Following the completion of his playing career, Brewster was a receivers coach with the Kansas City Chiefs and the Minnesota Vikings, earning a Super Bowl ring with the Chiefs in Super Bowl IV.

After football
Brewster retired from football and lived in Peculiar, Missouri on the outskirts of Kansas City. He is enshrined in the Indiana Football Hall of Fame. He died in Belton, Missouri on January 3, 2020, at the age of 89.

References

1930 births
2020 deaths
People from Portland, Indiana
Players of American football from Indiana
American football tight ends
Purdue Boilermakers football players
Purdue Boilermakers men's basketball players
Milwaukee Hawks draft picks
Cleveland Browns players
Pittsburgh Steelers players
Eastern Conference Pro Bowl players
Kansas City Chiefs coaches
Minnesota Vikings coaches
People from Peculiar, Missouri
American men's basketball players